Andrzej Dereziński (born 24 April 1944) is a Polish alpine skier. He competed in three events at the 1964 Winter Olympics.

References

1944 births
Living people
Polish male alpine skiers
Olympic alpine skiers of Poland
Alpine skiers at the 1964 Winter Olympics
People from Tatra County
20th-century Polish people